Restore may refer to:

ReStore - Retail building supply stores run by local Habitat for Humanity affiliates
"Restore", a single by Chris August
Restore International, former name of Love Does, a nonprofit organization
Restore plc, a British document management company
RESTORE (DOS command)
Restore (EP), a 2022 EP by South Korean duo Jinjin & Rocky

See also 
Restoration (disambiguation)